Let It Roll: Songs by George Harrison is the third compilation of songs recorded by English singer-songwriter George Harrison, and the first to span his entire solo career after the Beatles era. The collection was announced on 14 April 2009, the same day that Harrison received a star on the Hollywood Walk of Fame, and was released 16 June 2009, on both CD and in digital format.

Track selection
Let It Roll contains Harrison songs originally released on the Beatles' EMI-affiliated Apple Records and his Dark Horse label. All the tracks are presented in digitally remastered form, and the collection includes a 28-page booklet featuring previously unseen and rare photos together with an essay by music historian Warren Zanes. The track list was selected by George's widow, Olivia Harrison, with some assistance from close friends and family.

The album includes all of Harrison's songs that reached number 1 on the Billboard Hot 100 singles chart – "My Sweet Lord", "Isn't It a Pity", "Give Me Love (Give Me Peace on Earth)" and "Got My Mind Set on You", – as well as other international number 1 singles such as "What Is Life" and "All Those Years Ago". Live solo recordings of three Beatles songs ("While My Guitar Gently Weeps", "Something" and "Here Comes the Sun"), from the Grammy-winning album The Concert for Bangladesh, are also included.

iTunes exclusively offers the digital album with a previously unreleased bonus track, Harrison's demo version of "Isn't It a Pity".

Despite being marketed as Harrison's first career-spanning hits compilation, six of his twelve studio albums were not represented at all: Wonderwall Music (1968), Electronic Sound (1969), Dark Horse (1974), Extra Texture (Read All About It) (1975), Thirty Three & 1/3 (1976) and Gone Troppo (1982). In addition, several of his hit singles are absent from the track listing – songs such as "Bangla Desh", "Deep Blue", "Dark Horse", "Ding Dong, Ding Dong", "You", "This Song" and "Crackerbox Palace", all of which had charted in the top 40 of the Billboard Hot 100. No songs from Harrison's output with the Traveling Wilburys appear on the compilation.

Critical reception
In his review of Let It Roll, for Spin magazine, Andrew Hultkrans wrote that Harrison "arguably had a stronger, more consistent solo career than any of his [Beatles] bandmates", and added: "This hits collection avoids chronology, honouring the old and new alike as part of the same stylistic continuum."

Reception to the inclusion of live versions of Beatles-era compositions "While My Guitar Gently Weeps", "Something" and "Here Comes the Sun" was mixed. Some reviewers welcomed the songs as essential parts of Harrison's career, since the tracks came from his landmark Concert for Bangladesh shows in 1971; yet the same commentators suggested that the quality paled in comparison to the original studio recordings. Others compared the inclusion of Beatles-related material to EMI/Capitol 1976 compilation The Best of George Harrison, on which more than half of the tracks were songs recorded by the Beatles, thus downplaying the importance of Harrison's solo career. Some other critics wondered why Beatles songs were included, when songs from Harrison's supergroup the Traveling Wilburys (such as "Handle with Care") were overlooked.

Commercial performance
The album debuted at number 4 in the United Kingdom, with first week sales of 28,045 copies, becoming Harrison's highest-charting album there since 1973's Living in the Material World. In the United States, the album debuted at number 24 on the Billboard 200 chart, and as of 5 July 2012 had sold over 164,000 copies. In 2012, it charted at number 9 on Billboards Top Pop Catalog Albums.

Track listing
All songs by George Harrison, except where noted.

Album remastered by Giles Martin, individual producer credits are as follows:
Tracks 1, 8, 13, and 16: Jeff Lynne and George Harrison
Track 2: Harrison
Tracks 3–6, 11, 14, 17, and 19: Harrison and Phil Spector
Tracks 7, 10 and 12: Harrison, Lynne and Dhani Harrison
Track 9: Harrison and Ray Cooper
Track 15: Harrison and Russ Titelman
Track 18: Dave Edmunds

Charts

Weekly charts

Certifications

References

External links
Official Microsite- fragment of Georgeharrison.com

2009 greatest hits albums
Albums produced by George Harrison
Albums produced by Jeff Lynne
Albums produced by Phil Spector
Albums produced by Russ Titelman
George Harrison compilation albums
Capitol Records compilation albums
Compilation albums published posthumously
Apple Records compilation albums
Albums recorded at Apple Studios
Albums recorded at FPSHOT
Albums recorded at A&M Studios
Albums recorded at Trident Studios